Shawn may refer to:

Shawn (given name)
Shawn (surname)

See also 
 Sean
 Shaun
 

{[Shawn means God is Gracious}]
{[it comes from the Hebrew name John}]
This name is the anglicized version of the Irish Sean
{[Shawn- a student of Rosary college of commerce and Arts, Navelim}] 
{[Shawn- an honest person, people search out shawn for advice}]